Carlos Afonso Nobre (born March 27, 1951) is a Brazilian scientist and meteorologist who is mainly highlighted in global warming-related studies. Nobre spearheaded the multi-disciplinary, multinational Large-Scale Biosphere-Atmosphere Experiment in Amazonia, a program noted to have “revolutionized understanding of the Amazon rainforest and its role in the Earth system.”

Education
Nobre graduated in Electronic Engineering from the Instituto Tecnológico de Aeronáutica in 1974, and began working in Manaus at the Instituto Nacional de Pesquisas da Amazônia (INPA) the following year. He earned a Ph.D. in Meteorology at the Massachusetts Institute of Technology and studied Dynamic Meteorology of the Tropical Region with Jule Charney and Jagadish Shukla, pioneers in the construction of climate models, until 1982.

Biography 
Nobre returned to his birth city—São Paulo, Brazil—after receiving his Ph.D. Today he is a senior scientist at INPA but would visit abroad other times during research seasons. He began his research in 1988 as a visiting researcher at the University of Maryland, which would be recognized as pioneers in the analysis of the impacts of deforestation on the climate and posited the possibility of the Amazon becoming a savannah as a result of global warming, with potential mass extinction at the regional level. He worked in the coordination of large scientific projects in the Amazon and highlighted the Anglo-Brazilian Experiment of Amazon Climate Observations (ABRACOS) from 1990 to 1996, and the Large Scale Biosphere-Atmosphere Experiment in the Amazon (LBA) from 1993 to 2000.

References

External links
 
 

Climate activists
Recipients of the National Order of Scientific Merit (Brazil)
1951 births
Living people
Brazilian meteorologists